Jostein Wilmann (born 15 July 1953) is a Norwegian former professional road racing cyclist. His best performance came in the Tour de France of 1980, where he finished 14th overall. This is still the best result any Norwegian cyclist has achieved in the Tour de France general classification. He is also the only Norwegian cyclist to win the Tour de Romandie and the Setmana Catalana de Ciclisme, taking both victories in 1982. He is the father of racing cyclist Frederik Wilmann.

Major results

1975
 1st Stage 5a GP Tell
 2nd Overall Rheinland-Pfalz-Rundfahrt
1976
 3rd Overall Okolo Slovenska
1977
 7th Overall GP Tell
1978
 1st  Overall Tour of Austria
1st Stage 4
1979
 1st Overall Rheinland-Pfalz-Rundfahrt
 3rd  Team time trial, UCI Road World Championships
 3rd Overall Tour de l'Avenir
1980
 1st GP Union Dortmund
 4th Overall Deutschland Tour
1981
 3rd Druivenkoers-Overijse
 5th Overall Tour of Belgium
 10th Overall Deutschland Tour
 10th Tour du Nord-Ouest
1982
 1st  Overall Tour de Romandie
1st Stage 2
 1st  Overall Setmana Catalana de Ciclisme
 1st Stage 5a Deutschland Tour
 2nd La Flèche Wallonne
 2nd Rund um den Henninger Turm
 5th Overall Tour de Suisse
 6th Overall Super Prestige Pernod
 6th Züri-Metzgete
 9th Amstel Gold Race
1983
 2nd Grand Prix Cerami
 6th Overall Driedaagse van De Panne-Koksijde
 7th Overall Tour de Suisse

Grand Tour general classification results timeline

Major stage race general classification results timeline

Monuments and Classics results timeline

References

External links

1953 births
Living people
Norwegian male cyclists
People from Sør-Trøndelag
People from Skaun
Sportspeople from Trøndelag